In May 2001 the Fifth Labour Government of New Zealand decided to disband the Royal New Zealand Air Force's air combat force by withdrawing its Douglas A-4K Skyhawk fighter aircraft and Aermacchi MB-339 trainers without replacement. This followed a debate over whether 28 General Dynamics F-16 A/B Fighting Falcon fighter aircraft should be leased from the United States to replace the Skyhawks. The RNZAF's air combat units were disbanded in October 2001, and many of the aircraft were eventually sold.

In November 1998, The National-led Coalition Government made the decision to lease 28 F-16 A/B fighter aircraft. The Labour Party opposition opposed this decision on the grounds that the funds would be better spent on the Army. Following Labour's victory in the 1999 New Zealand general election, the new government commissioned a review of the fighter lease. While the report recommended reducing the number of F-16s, the government decided instead to cancel the deal in February 2000. The air combat force was disbanded following further consideration, with the government stating that the funding this freed up would be reallocated to other elements of the New Zealand Defence Force.

The decision to disband the RNZAF's air combat force was controversial. The opposition National Party disagreed with the decision, as did many RNZAF personnel. Defence commentators' views differed, with some seeing the air combat force as being of little value while others feeling that New Zealand would be overly reliant on its allies, Australia in particular. Public opinion was also split, but a majority agreed with the decision.

Background

Skyhawk Delivery 
For over three decades, the Douglas A-4 Skyhawk  and TA-4 served as New Zealand's primary combat aircraft. This decision, along with the purchase of the Bell 47 and Bell UH-1 Iroqouis helicopters and Lockheed P-3 Orion maritime patrol aircraft, reflected the closer strategic relationship with the United States and Australia in the 1960s. In April 1968, 14 were ordered at the cost of $24.65 million.  

The 10 A-4K and 4 TA-4K aircraft arrived in Auckland aboard the USS Okinawa in May 1970. The delivery party was met with minor local opposition from anti-war protest groups such as the Progressive Youth Movement who were concerned about New Zealand and its friendly relations with the United States in regards to the ongoing Vietnam War.

Project Kahu 

By the 1980s, the Skyhawks were reaching the end of their effective use. Three options were considered; the purchase of more capable second hand aircraft such as the F-4 Phantom II, new aircraft such as the F-16 Fighting Falcon, or an upgrade for the A-4 Skyhawk. Eventually, a comprehensive upgrade to the Skyhawk was chosen.

The Skyhawk upgrade was extremely comprehensive, including a new radar, HOTAS controls, glass cockpit with HUD and new inertial navigation system. The aircraft also received armament upgrades including the capability to fire AIM-9L Sidewinder air-to-air missiles, AGM-65 Maverick ground-to-air missiles and GBU-16 Paveway II laser-guided bombs. The cost of the project was NZ$140 million and gave the RNZAF Skyhawks the electronic “eyes and ears” of a modern fighter aircraft such as the F-16 Fighting Falcon or McDonnell Douglas F/A-18 Hornet. Despite cooling of NZ-US relations over New Zealands new anti-nuclear policy, the US Congress gave its approval in December 1985, while other work was accomplished by New Zealand based companies such as Pacific Aerospace. 

To complement these upgrades, the new Aermacchi MB-339 was introduced as an advanced jet trainer.

Wing Commander Ian Gore said "The Skyhawk has gone from an aircraft with no systems you could rely on, to one with the capability of modern front-line fighters, at a fraction of the cost."

Flight Lieutenant Murray Neilson noted: "We were constantly surprised how well we performed in air-to-air combat against superior aircraft, especially the F-16 … Kahu has brought the Skyhawk into the 1990s."

The 1997 White Paper commented further: "The aircraft are old but sturdy. They have been rewinged and seven years ago were given a major upgrade. They have sufficient life left to perform effectively into the next decade."

However, while the upgrades took place, it was further planned to eventually replace the Skyhawk fleet with leased F-16 Aircraft from the United States in the near future.

Labour Opposition 
The opposition Labour Party expressed concern over the F-16 lease at the time it was announced. On 21 October 1999, Phil Goff said: "Labour opposes the decision to invest what will amount to $700 million on the F-16 jet aircraft. It also opposes the purchase of further ANZAC frigates. Neither can be considered a priority if peace keeping is to continue to be the focus of deployment of our armed forces. In opting for frigates and F-16s, the National Government has put display ahead of utility. It has been concerned more about pleasing military chiefs in Australia and the United States, than about meeting the practical needs arising from the responsibilities we are actually placing on our armed forces."

National MP Wayne Mapp said:

"The Air Force requirements are of a different character. Everyone accepts the need for new strategic air transport and upgraded maritime surveillance. The sharp differences settle on the lease of the F-16s. … The Air Combat Force is not just about military utility. It is also about restoring our Defence relationships, particularly with the United States. If we had failed to accept the extremely favourable lease arrangements for the F-16s, our friends and allies would question our commitment to the security of the region. Our overall relationship with the United States would have been severely damaged."

The Labour Party's policy platform for the 1999 New Zealand general election stated that it opposed the F-16 deal. The party's defence spokesperson stated that it would be better to spend the money required for the F-16s on addressing deficiencies in the New Zealand Army's equipment.

Disbandment actions under Helen Clark and the Fifth Labour Government

Cancellation of the F-16 Deal 

In the 1999 general election, the Helen Clark-led Labour Party defeated the National Party, becoming the largest single party in the House of Representatives. Labour formed a minority coalition government with the left-leaning Alliance party, supported by the Green Party.

The new government commissioned Derek Quigley to review the F-16 deal on 20 December 1999. Quigley's report was published on 6 March 2000. The report was critical of a lack of proper processes in determining defence acquisition priorities, and noted that multiple top-priority projects had not yet had funding allocated. Quigley recommended "that the New Zealand Government consider approaching the US Government with a view to renegotiating the current F-16 package to include a lesser number of aircraft" and that defence procurement processes be improved more broadly.

On 20 March 2000 Clark announced the cancellation of the F-16 deal. She stated that while reducing the number of F-16s as recommended by Quigley would have moderated the funding pressure the lease posed for the defence budget, "it would not have removed it". She also noted that while the lease deal was a bargain, "the mere existence of a bargain at a sale is not a reason for buying it". Clark stated that the Government would focus on improving priority-setting in the defence budget, which would include consideration of whether the air combat force should be retained. Opinion polls found that most New Zealanders supported the decision to cancel the F-16 deal.

Disbandment 

The Department of the Prime Minister and Cabinet published a report on options for the RNZN's air combat capability in February 2001. This report argued that reducing the number of strike aircraft to 14 would not free up enough funds by itself to meet the needs of other elements of the RNZAF. The report judged that disbanding the air combat force "would assist in the rebuilding of the NZDF, significantly reducing the need for additional funding".

On 8 May 2001, Clark announced that the government had decided to disband the RNZAF's air combat force, which would involve withdrawing the Skyhawks and Aermacchi MB-339 training jets. The government estimated that this would free up $870 million over ten years, which would be reallocated to other areas of the NZDF. In particular, the government intended to improve the capabilities of the Army.

There was a mixed reaction to Clark's announcement. Members of the air combat force were deeply disappointed, and morale across the RNZAF was badly affected. The views of defence experts differed, with some also being disappointed while others supported the decision on the grounds that the air combat force was of little practical value. The National Party opposition disagreed with disbanding the air combat force, with opposition leader Jenny Shipley labelling it "the bludger's option". Clark rejected this accusation, and stated in parliament "Is the difference between being a bludger and not being a bludger whether you have 17 clapped-out Skyhawks?". The decision was also debated in the community, but received overall public support.

The RNZAF Air Combat Force, comprising 2, 14, and 75 Squadrons, were officially disbanded on 13 December 2001. The disbandment day parade marched the three squadron standards to the RNZAF Base Ohakea chapel and were laid to hang from the rafters, until such time as the squadron/s were reinstated. Alongside the disbanding of the aircraft themselves, the RNZAF saw the loss of a significant number of pilots, equipment and technical knowledge. Many Pilots and other service personnel were made redundant, with many seeking employment in the Royal Air Force and Royal Australian Air Force. Additionally, support equipment, such as arrestor cables and maintenance facilities at RNZAF Base Ohakea and RNZAF Base Auckland were sold off.

A political group of concerned civilians and ex-serviceman, called "Save Our Squadrons (SOS)" was formed to protest the move, and took high court action in an attempt to prevent its loss. Particular concerns were made about the lack of New Zealand's ability to conduct air policing, in the wake of the September 11 attacks in the United States. The court action was not successful.  In November 2008, the Labour Government was defeated by the National Party led by John Key. While wishing to reinstate the ACF, at this point, it was deemed unfeasible due to the loss of equipment, pilots and the deteriorating condition of the aircraft in storage at RNZAF Base Woodbourne.

Disposal 

The RNZAF withdrew the Skyhawks and Aermacchis from service in 2001 and they were put into storage awaiting sale. Maintenance and storage work was contracted to SAFE Air at RNZAF Base Ohakea under the Air Combat Force Disposal Unit (ACFDU). Most aircraft were later sent to RNZAF Base Woodbourne for storage indoors from 2001 to 2007.

The final A-4 flight took place with airframe NZ6205 on the 30th of July 2004, piloted by ex Air Force pilot Squadron Leader Chris Underwood.

In December 2007, the aircraft were transferred outside with a latex covering. However, due to the wet climate of New Zealand, the condition of these aircraft rapidly deteriorated, with some sustaining significant water damage.

In 2011 eight former RNZAF A-4K and TA-4K Skyhawks were sold to Draken International. The Skyhawks are preserved in their RNZAF colour schemes and are used as an aggressor squadron for the USAF and US Navy. Draken International also bought 8 former RNZAF Aermacchi MB-339 training jets. Draken International received permission from the New Zealand Government to operate the aircraft retaining their original RNZAF liveries. The remaining aircraft were given to museums in New Zealand and Australia.

See also 

 Royal New Zealand Air Force

References

Citations

Bibliography
 

New Zealand military aircraft
2001 in New Zealand
Royal New Zealand Air Force
Military history of New Zealand
Helen Clark